The Amalgamated Society of Foremen Lightermen of River Thames was a trade union in the United Kingdom. It merged with the Transport and General Workers' Union in 1969.

See also
 List of trade unions
 Transport and General Workers' Union
 TGWU amalgamations

References
Arthur Ivor Marsh, Victoria Ryan. Historical Directory of Trade Unions, Volume 5 Ashgate Publishing, Ltd., Jan 1, 2006 pg. 437

Defunct trade unions of the United Kingdom
Port workers' trade unions
Trade unions disestablished in 1969
Transport and General Workers' Union amalgamations
Trade unions based in London